Powellton is an unincorporated community located in Brunswick County, Virginia.

References

Unincorporated communities in Virginia
Unincorporated communities in Brunswick County, Virginia